The 1981 Asian Basketball Confederation Championship for Men were held in Kolkata, India.

Preliminary round

Group A

Group B

Group C

Final round
 The results and the points of the matches between the same teams that were already played during the preliminary round shall be taken into account for the final round.

Classification 7th–12th

Championship

Final standing

Awards

References

External links
 archive.fiba.com

Asia Championship, 1981
1981
B
B
November 1981 sports events in Asia